Men's Downhill World Cup 1993/1994

Final point standings

In Men's Downhill World Cup 1993/94 all results count. Marc Girardelli won the cup without winning a single competition.

References
 fis-ski.com

External links
 

World Cup
FIS Alpine Ski World Cup men's downhill discipline titles